Orophea hastata is a species of plant in the family Annonaceae. It is found in Peninsular Malaysia and Singapore.

References

hastata
Flora of Malaya
Least concern plants
Taxonomy articles created by Polbot